Ludo Dielis (born 23 February 1945) is a Belgian professional carom billiards player.

When Raymond Ceulemans, the reigning champion, opted not to participate in the world championship in 1981 over some circumstances, Dielis was selected as a temporary replacement. Rising to the occasion, he won the title besting Nobuaki Kobayashi. He won the title again in 1989 against Torbjörn Blomdahl.

References

External links

 Dielis's official website

Belgian carom billiards players
World champions in three-cushion billiards
World Cup champions in three-cushion billiards
Living people
1945 births